Onkel Bill fra New York is a 1959 Danish comedy film directed by Peer Guldbrandsen and starring Dirch Passer.

Cast
 Dirch Passer as Hans Høj
 Helle Virkner as Susanne Høj
 Ove Sprogøe as Johnny Jensen
 Ulla Lock as Kate
 Emil Hass Christensen as Uncle Bill
 Karen Marie Løwert as Helga (Nuser / Svigermor)
 Judy Gringer as Frk. Jytte
 Annette Post as Frk. Hanne
 Aage Winther-Jørgensen as Valdemar
 Victor Cornelius as The Pianist
 Gunnar Bigum as Conference Speaker

External links

1959 films
1950s Danish-language films
1959 comedy films
Danish black-and-white films
Films directed by Peer Guldbrandsen
Films scored by Sven Gyldmark